Cosmopterix bactrophora is a moth in the family Cosmopterigidae. It was described by Edward Meyrick in 1908. It is found in South Africa.

References

Endemic moths of South Africa
Moths described in 1908
bactrophora
South Africa